This is a list of Swedish television related events from 1999.

Events
29 May - Sweden wins the 44th Eurovision Song Contest in Jerusalem. The winning song is "Take Me to Your Heaven", performed by Charlotte Nilsson.
Unknown - Agneta Sjödin takes over from Lasse Holm as host of Sikta mot stjärnorna.
Unknown - Tom Nordahl performing as Jon Bon Jovi wins the fifth season of Sikta mot stjärnorna.

Debuts

Television shows
1–24 December - Julens hjältar

1990s
Sikta mot stjärnorna (1994-2002)

Ending this year

Births

Deaths

See also
1999 in Sweden

References